This is a list of Members of Parliament (MPs) elected to the House of Commons of the United Kingdom by English constituencies for the Fifty-Seventh Parliament of the United Kingdom (2017–2019).

It includes both MPs elected at the 2017 general election, held on 8 June 2017, and those subsequently elected in by-elections.

The list is sorted by the name of the MP, and MPs who did not serve throughout the Parliament are italicised. New MPs elected since the general election are noted at the bottom of the page.

Composition

Election

At Dissolution

MPs in the East of England region

MPs in the East Midlands region

MPs in the London region

MPs in the North East region

MPs in the North West region

MPs in the South East region

MPs in the South West region

MPs in the West Midlands region

MPs in the Yorkshire and the Humber region

By-elections
 2018 Lewisham East by-election
 2019 Peterborough by-election

See also
 2017 United Kingdom general election
 List of MPs elected in the 2017 United Kingdom general election
 List of MPs for constituencies in Scotland (2017–2019)
 List of MPs for constituencies in Northern Ireland (2017–2019)
 List of MPs for constituencies in Wales (2017–2019)
 :Category:UK MPs 2017–2019

Notes

References

England
2017-
MPs